Star Street is one of Bethlehem's oldest commercial streets, connecting the northern part of the Old City to the southern part. Most of the buildings along Star Street were built in the 19th century. Prior to the Second Intifada in 2001, there were 98 shops on Star Street. Due to a sharp decline in tourism in Bethlehem because of the violence, nearly half were closed. However, in 2008, the number of shops increased to 63. Since June 2008, a "Thursday Market", a daylong celebration of business, commerce, and community, has been established to encourage business along the street. The Baituna al-Talhami Museum and the historic House of Mansour are located along Star Street.

See also
 Manger Square
 Church of the Nativity
 Mosque of Omar (Jerusalem)
 Omar Mukhtar Street
 Bet Lahem Live Festival

References

Bethlehem
Streets in the State of Palestine